Jiminy Peak is a mid-sized alpine ski resort in the northeastern United States, located in western Massachusetts in the Taconic Mountains at Hancock, northwest of nearby Pittsfield. The summit of Jiminy Peak, which includes the Hendricks Summit Lodge, is located in Lanesborough.

The mountain is owned by Och-Ziff Capital Management but the operating company is owned and managed by Brian Fairbank, the longtime former owner of the Resort. During the winter Jiminy Peak offers activities for the whole family, including skiing, snowboarding, outdoor pools, and various restaurants. There are 45 trails and nine lifts, including a six-person, high speed chairlift. In the summer additional activities are offered at Mountain Adventure Park, such as an alpine super slide, mountain coaster, hiking, and mountain biking. The Aerial Adventure Park is a challenge course up in the trees. Five levels provide both physical and mental challenges for all levels. Jiminy Peak has installed the second mountain coaster in the country, the first on the East Coast, and is the home of the nation's first Alpine Super Slide (June 1977).

In August 2007, Jiminy became the first private U.S. business to invest in its own megawatt class wind turbine.  The turbine generates approximately 35% of the annual energy used at the resort.  The winds blow strongest in the winters, which is when the resort uses the most energy, for lifts and snowmaking.  This is the largest commitment in Jiminy Peak's ongoing environmental sustainability efforts. In February 2012, the Resort installed a CoGeneration Unit in the Country Inn to provide both heat and hot water to the hotel.

In the past decade, the mountain has been increasingly developed for real estate, as the demand for housing and activities has also increased.  The mountain has  of meeting space for meetings, conferences, weddings, parties, and other events.

Lift System

Jiminy Peak has 7 chairlifts, and 2 Magic Carpets.

Main Lifts

Past lifts

Summer attractions
Aerial Adventure Park
Mountain Coaster
Alpine Super Slide
Soaring Eagle
Giant Swing
Chairlift Rides
Rock Climbing Wall
Euro Bungy Trampoline
Bounce Houses
Kid Climb
Hiking

Labor controversies 
In 2018, the U.S. Department of Labor's Wage and Hour Division found that Jiminy Park had violated The Fair Labor Standards Act by employing 44 minors, age 14 and 15, in shifts that exceeded the maximum amounted hours for employing minors. The Fairbank group took corrective measured and was ordered to pay a $21,582 penalty.

On January 18, 2019 Jiminy Resorts was the center of a social media controversy regarding a printed employee notice. The printed notice, which was pinned to a cork board, was written to inform employees of the John Harvard’s Brewery and Ale House that the winter storm were not "an excuse to miss work". In addition the letter stated that in the event that a "state of emergency is declared" that the resort was "exempt." The letter concludes by stating that if employees choose to stay overnight at the resort "NO accommodations available. Not even a pillow or blanket." The notice, which was allegedly taken by an employee, was posted online and shared 2,000 times by January 20.

References

External links
 

Buildings and structures in Berkshire County, Massachusetts
Ski areas and resorts in Massachusetts
Sports in Berkshire County, Massachusetts
Taconic Mountains
Tourist attractions in Berkshire County, Massachusetts